Maa Babu is a 1960 Indian Telugu-language drama film co-written and directed by T. Prakash Rao. The film stars Akkineni Nageswara Rao and Savitri, with music composed by T. Chalapathi Rao. It is a remake of the Hindi film Chirag Kahan Roshni Kahan (1959).

Plot 
Dr. Anand (Akkineni Nageswara Rao) is a well known respectable doctor in the society, his wife dies on the operating table, giving birth to a baby boy. At the same time, a widowed pregnant lady Ratna Devi (Savitri) has a miscarriage, as Anand promised her to protect the child, he gives his son to Ratna Devi hiding the truth. After that, grief-stricken, Anand becomes a wanderer and returns after four years. Due to affection for his son, he starts being a frequent visitor in their life which does not augur well with Ratna Devi's mother-in-law (Kannamba) and sister-in-law (M. Saroja) who make her life miserable by attributing illicit relation between them and forcibly stops Anand. Shortly thereafter, Anand marries a nurse, Maya (M. N. Rajam) who is a spendthrift, does not get along with Anand, and he finds out that she cannot conceive. Eventually, Anand's dad passes away, he leaves considerable wealth to Anand's child, including a monthly allowance of Rs.10,000. At that time, Maya learns the birth secret of Anand's child, so, she files a case in the court and wins. Therefore, Ratna Devi has to hands over the child to Maya, but the depressed child is not able to stay with Maya and runs away from home. At Present, everybody is in search of the child, in that bedlam, Maya dies in an accident. Finally, the movie ends, Anand giving back the child to Ratna Devi and continues his journey on official duty by dedicating his life to the hospital.

Cast 
Akkineni Nageswara Rao as Dr. Anand
Savitri as Ratnadevi
M. N. Rajam as Maya
Gummadi as Dr. Ashok
Relangi
Ramana Reddy
V. Nagayya
Mikkilineni
C.S.R
Chadalavada as Ramu
Allu Ramalingaiah
Kannamba
Honey Irani
M. Saroja
Nalla Ramamurthy

Soundtrack 
Music composed by T. Chalapathi Rao.

References

External links 
 

1960 drama films
1960s pregnancy films
1960s Telugu-language films
Films scored by T. Chalapathi Rao
Indian drama films
Indian pregnancy films
Telugu remakes of Hindi films